Dontrell "Cockroach" Hamilton is the name of a fictional supervillain appearing in American comic books published by Marvel Comics. The character is most closely related to Luke Cage, one of the early black Marvel superheroes.

Publication history
The character first appears in Luke Cage, Power Man #28 (December 1975), produced by Don McGregor, George Tuska, and Vinnie Colletta.

Fictional character biography
Growing up in Harlem, Dontrell was petrified by the night's noise. However, over time, he gradually become accustomed to them, besides the cockroaches that infested his home. These early experiences lead to an affinity for cockroaches and "Cheese Snipz".<ref>Official Handbook of the Marvel Universe 2006 #5</ref>

Later in life, Hamilton turns to a life of crime, becoming a mob enforcer (alias "Cockroach") for Ray "Piranha" Jones. During an investigation of Dontrell, Power Man is attacked by Dontrell and Ray's men at the Harlem River docks. Power Man is eventually knocked out and carried back to Ray's penthouse, but breaks free and attacks Ray. Power Man and Ray fall into a pool of piranhas, and Dontrell seals them in and escapes.

Dontrell and Ray escape conviction and move to Stamford, Connecticut. They demand protection money from the locals, who refuse, but are eventually accepted into the community. However, three women Vita Buchetta, Ann Repucci, and Annette Cortese shame the members of the community for accepting Dontrell and Ray, while secretly using them to use them to start their own criminal careers. When Terror Inc. is hired by an unknown party to kill Ray, Dontrell cannot defend him because his custom shotgun, "Josh", keeps jamming. Upon examining the information from the cartridges, Terror Inc. realized that Ray had hired them. Terror Inc. saved Ray from the mobsters and the arriving Punisher as Dontrell chased after Terror Inc. in their cars as Terror Inc. killed off Ray.

During the Shadowland storyline, Dontrell appears as a member of Nightshade's Flashmob and attacks Victor Alvarez. Dontrell fired on Victor until his gun was compressed by Luke Cage upon his arrival with Iron Fist. The Flashmob was later taken, arrested and taken to Ryker's Island, but Nightshade's solicitor Big Ben Donovan secured Dontrell's release.

Hamilton later appears as one criminal, discussing the reward that Tombstone had offered to anyone who could recover the Supersoul Stone from Luke Cage and Iron Fist. When a group of "preemptive" vigilantes assault inactive villains, Hamilton joins the relatives of several of the victims in requesting help from the Heroes for Hire. Cage has Hamilton assist with investigating the "Preemptive Strike" by having him consult with criminals like Piranha Jones. After discovering that the Preemptive Strike work for Alex Wilder, Hamilton betrays the Heroes for Hire and joins Alex Wilder's New Pride alongside Black Mariah, Cottonmouth, and Gamecock.  

Powers and abilities
Dontrell Hamilton has no superpowers but is a skilled marksman, using advanced pieces of artillery. His first weapon was a six-barreled shotgun built by himself and named "Josh". 

Other versions

Earth-X
In the Earth-X reality, Dontrell "Cockroach" Hamilton's history is the same, but in the present he has died.

House of M
In the House of M reality, Dontrell "Cockroach" Hamilton is a mutant gangster with a cockroach appearance.

In other media
 Cockroach Hamilton appears in The Avengers: Earth's Mightiest Heroes episode "To Steal an Ant-Man" as a member of William Cross' gang.
 Cockroach Hamilton appears in the second season of Luke Cage'', portrayed by Dorian Missick. This version is a petty criminal who runs an off-the-books casino and was recently released from prison with help from corrupt NYPD Detective Rafael Scarfe. Additionally, Hamilton is physically abusive towards his girlfriend Andrea "Drea" Powell and her son CJ. After running afoul of Luke Cage, the latter nearly kills him until one of Hamilton's neighbors intervenes. Hamilton subsequently sues Cage for his injuries and hires Benjamin Donovan to represent him in court. However, Hamilton is later killed by Bushmaster.

References

External links
 Dontrell Hamilton at Marvel Wiki
 Dontrell Hamilton at Comic Vine
 Dontrell Hamilton at Marvel Appendix

Marvel Comics supervillains
Characters created by George Tuska
Marvel Comics male supervillains
Luke Cage